WZQZ 1180 AM is a radio station broadcasting a country music format. Licensed to Trion, Georgia, the station serves the areas of Summerville, Georgia, Rome, Georgia, and La Fayette, Georgia. WZQZ is currently owned by HS Productions, Inc. The station is in association with NBC Radio News and the Georgia News Network for news broadcasts, and produce their own local news programs. Jimmy Holbrook owns both AM 1180 and HS Productions and moderates as weekday reporter and DJ for the station along with Bonnie Fletcher. The station has six local newscasts daily and serves as the only daily local news source for Chattooga County.  The station's signal can also be heard 24 hours-a-day on WSKY Television channel 21.8 (Charter Cable 184).

1180 AM is a United States clear-channel frequency.

References

External links
WZQZ facebook
WZQZ's website

ZQZ
Country radio stations in the United States
Radio stations established in 1980
ZQS